In knot theory, a virtual knot is a generalization of knots in 3-dimensional Euclidean space, to knots in thickened surfaces   modulo an equivalence relation called stabilization/destabilization. Here  is required to be closed and oriented.

Overview
In the theory of classical knots, knots can be considered equivalence classes of knot diagrams under the Reidemeister moves.  Likewise a virtual knot can be considered an equivalence of virtual knot diagrams that are equivalent under generalized Reidemeister moves. Virtual knots allow for the existence of, for example, knots whose Gauss codes which could not exist in 3-dimensional Euclidean space. A virtual knot diagram is a 4-valent planar graph, but each vertex is now allowed to be a classical crossing or a new type called virtual.  The generalized moves show how to manipulate such diagrams to obtain an equivalent diagram; one move called the semi-virtual move involves both classical and virtual crossings, but all the other moves involve only one variety of crossing.

Virtual knots are important, and there is a strong relation between Quantum Field Theory and virtual knots.

Virtual knots themselves are fascinating objects, and having many connections to other areas of mathematics. 
Virtual knots have many exciting connections with other fields of knots theory. The unsolved problem shown is an important motivation to the study of virtual knots.

See section 1.1 of this paper [KOS]

for the background and the history of this problem. 
Kauffman submitted a solution in the case of the product manifold of closed oriented surface and the closed interval, by introducing virtual 1-knots
.
It is open in the other cases. Witten’s path integral for Jones polynomial is written for links in any compact 3-manifold formally, but the calculus is not done even in physics level in any case other than the 3-sphere (the 3-ball, the 3-space R3). This problem is also open in physics level. In the case of Alexander polynomial, this problem is solved.

A classical knot can also be considered an equivalence class of Gauss diagrams under certain moves coming from the Reidemeister moves.  Not all Gauss diagrams are realizable as knot diagrams, but by considering all equivalence classes of Gauss diagrams we obtain virtual knots.

A classical knot can be considered an ambient isotopy class of embeddings of the circle into a thickened 2-sphere.  This can be generalized by considering such classes of embeddings into thickened higher-genus surfaces.  This is not quite what we want since adding a handle to a (thick) surface will create a higher-genus embedding of the original knot.  The adding of a handle is called stabilization and the reverse process destabilization.  Thus a virtual knot can be considered an ambient isotopy class of embeddings of the circle into thickened surfaces with the equivalence given by (de)stabilization.

Some basic theorems relating classical and virtual knots:
If two classical knots are equivalent as virtual knots, they are equivalent as classical knots.
There is an algorithm to determine if a virtual knot is classical.
There is an algorithm to determine if two virtual knots are equivalent.

It is important that there is a relation among the following. See the paper [KOS] cited above and below.

 Virtual equivalence of virtual 1-knot diagrams, which is a set of virtual 1-knots.
 Welded equivalence of virtual 1-knot diagrams
 Rotational welded equivalence of virtual 1-knot diagrams
 Fiberwise equivalence of virtual 1-knot diagrams

Virtual 2-knots are also defined. 
See the paper cited above.

See also
Knots and graphs

References

External links 
 A Table of Virtual Knots
Elementary explanation with diagrams

Algebraic topology
Combinatorics
Knots and links